The statue of Lord Palmerston is an outdoor bronze sculpture depicting Henry John Temple, 3rd Viscount Palmerston, located at Parliament Square in London, United Kingdom. The statue, sculpted by Thomas Woolner and unveiled in 1876, stands on a granite pedestal. It is Grade II listed.

References

External links
 

1859 establishments in the United Kingdom
Lord Palmerston
Bronze sculptures in the United Kingdom
Palmerston
Monuments and memorials in London
Outdoor sculptures in London
Parliament Square
Palmerston
Palmerston